The Stockholms Fotbollförbund (Stockholm Football Association) is one of the 24 district organisations of the Swedish Football Association. It administers lower tier football in Stockholm County.

Background 

Stockholms Fotbollförbund, commonly referred to as Stockholms FF, is the governing body for football in Stockholm County (except some peripherical municipalities). The Association was founded on 29 March 1917 when 49 teams registered with the organisation. In the last decade the number of senior clubs has been well over 500 clubs. There is currently 450 member clubs.  Based in Solna, Stockholm, the Association's Chairman is Sune Jerry Reinhold.

There are now about 60,000 active players participating in Stockholm football, this is about 24 percent of the total number of sports activities in the district. In 2005, for example, there were around 30,363 registered players (24,028 men and 6,335 women participants). To this can be added 30,000 young adolescents who take part in the S:t Eriks Cupen.

Stockholm Football is important for children and young people's upbringing and good social development. The future vision is hoped to renew cooperation with schools. In today's modern society it is essential that children's fitness and energies are stimulated.

Affiliated Members 

The following clubs are affiliated to the Stockholms FF:

A C Camelen
AC Azzurri
Aconcagua FK
Adelsö IF
Afghan FK
Afro-Skandinaviska IF
AIF Kista
AIK DFF
AIK FF
AIK Fotboll AB
AK Stockholmsatleterna
Akademiska FF
Akademiska SK Spotlight
Akropolis IF
Al-Azhar IF
Albion FC
Alby IF
Alianza IF
Amara FC
Amauta IF
Andeboda BK
Andino IF
Apollon Solna FK
Arameisk-Syrianska IF
Armeniska FC
Arte IF
Assur Föreningen
Assyriska Botkyrka FF
Assyriska FF Babylon
Assyriska KIF N.botkyrk
Atlas IF
Atlas Stockholm FK
Atletico Nacka FF
Atlético Stockholm FF
Attunda IF
Ayacucho Latinam. IF
Ayasofya FF
Bagarmossen Kärrtorp BK
Bagis Ultras BK
Bajen DFF
Bajen United FC
Bällsta FF
Barkarby SK
Bele Barkarby FF
Bele Barkarby IF
Benadir IF
Bengal Tigers FC
Bethnahrin IF
Betongens BK
BK Bleket
BK Borsten
BK Bosman
BK Carmen
BK Esperanto Fotboll
BK Gamla Enskede
BK Gamla Karlbergare
BK Gläntan
BK Höjden
BK Lugnet
BK Nore
BK Sandplan
BK Saturnus
BK Sol
BK Tjäder
BK Träsket
BK Yardies
Black Stars IF
Blue Hill KF
Bolivia IF
Bollmora BOIS
Bollmora Internacional IKF
Bollstanäs DFF
Bollstanäs HFF
Bollstanäs SK
Bondegatans Bajare FF
Boo FF
Boo SK
Boo TFF
Bromma Blackeberg FK
Brommapojkarna DFF
Bromstens IK
Carioca KIF
Cassi FF
Cim Bom SK
Colombia IKF Stockholm
Dalarö SK
Danderyds SK
Deportivo IF
Djurgården TFF
Djurgårdens Elitfotboll AB
Djurgårdens IF DFF
Djurgårdens IF FF
Djurgårdsbrunns FC
Djurö-Vindö IF
Edessa Syrianska KIF
Ekerö BoIS
Ekerö IK
En Bro Förmyckers IF
Enebybergs IF
Enskede FF
Enskede IK
Enskededalen FC
Enskedefältets BK
Eri BoIS
Eriksbergs BK
Erikslunds KF
Eritreanska FC i Husby-Kista
Essinge IK
Fagersjö BOIS
Falcao Futsal Club Stockholm
FC Andrea Doria
FC Bajen
FC Ballstars
FC Björnligan
FC Djursholm
FC Hallunda
FC Inter Orhoy
FC Jakobsberg
FC Järfälla
FC Kasam
FC Krukan
FC Nacka
FC of Hässelby
FC Plavi Team Stockholm
FC Söder
FC Southpoint
FC Sparta Sollentuna
FC Sticklinge
FC Stockholm City
FC Stockholm Internazionale
FC Tolkarna
FC Vårby
FC Väsby United
FF Forza Södermalm
FF Täby City
FF Tenstakamraterna
Fisksätra IF
Fittja Drivkraft KIF
Fittja IF
FK Atleterna
FK Bagarmossen
FK Bromma
FK Favoriterna Lidingö
FK Gunners United
FK Jakobsbergs PP
FK National Stockholm
FK Östermalm
FK Solna
FK Villastan
Flemingsberg FC
FOC Farsta
Föreningen Svenska Österbotten
Fortuna Celtic FC
Fruängens IF
Fuerza Latina IKF
Fullersta FK
Gala AC
Gärdets FF
Gimonäs FC
Grödinge SK
Gröndals IK
Gröne Jägaren FF
Gubbängen/Tallen IK
Gudö BoIS
Gustavsbergs IF FK
Hagalunds IS
Hägernäs FC
Hägersten SK
Hagges BK
Hallonbergen IF
Hammarby Fotboll AB
Hammarby IF DFF
Hammarby IF FF
Hammarby Talang FF
Handelskamraternas IS
Haninge DFF
Haninge DFF United
Hanvikens SK
Hässelby SK FF
Högalids IF
Högdalens AIS
Huddinge IF
Huvudsta IS
Iberito IF
Iberoamericana IF
Idrottsgatans BK
IF Anthropoi
IF Atletico Camelen
IF Brommapojkarna
IF Elpe
IF Fritidsgiganterna Duck
IF Kongolesisk Afrieuro
IF Löfströms United
IF Lokomotiv Blackeberg
IF Olympia Farsta
IF Söderkamraterna
IF Sol De America
IFK Aspudden-Tellus
IFK Bergshamra
IFK Haninge/Brandbergen
IFK Lidingö FK
IFK Östberga
IFK Österåker FK
IFK Stockholm
IFK Stocksund
IFK Täby FK
IFK Tumba FK
IFK Vaxholm
IFK Viksjö
Iftin Kultur och IF
IK Frej
IK Hephata
IK Hoppet
IK Makkabi
IK Säbysjön
IK Sture/Tanto
IK Syriska
IK Tellus
IK Vasastan
Ingarö IF
Inter-Afro KIF
Irakiska FK Kista
IV Drottninghamn
Järfälla FF
Järfälla Syrianska FF
Järla IF FK
Jarlabergs IF
Jeenyo IF
Kafa IF
Kallhälls FF
Kälvesta IOFF FK
Karlbergs BK
Kärrdals IF
Kärrtorps BK
Kaspiens IF
Kista SC KFUK-KFUM
Kista United IF
Kista Vasalunds IF
Kofkella Kultur o IF
Konyaspor Kultur och IF
Korpen Stockholms Motionsidrottsförening
Kransen United FF
Kronobergs BK
Kungens Kurva IF
Kungsängens IF
Kungsholms FK
Långholmen FC
Lado Sur FC
Latino America KIF
Lautaro IF
Libertad IF
Lidingö Gazoliners FC
Lidingö Latinamerikanska KIF
Lidingö SK
Ljungbackens IF
Ljusterö IS
Los Blancos CF
Los Ché IF
Los Copihues IF
Los Pumas IKF
Lunda SK
Magallanes IF
Mälarens FF
Mälarhöjdens IK
Marche FC
Mariebergs SK
Medborgarplatsens FF
Meladen IF
Midia KIF
Möja IF
Mörtnäs IF
Mosebacke FF
Munsö IF
Nacka Allstars DFF
Nacka DFF
Nacka DFK
Nackapojkarna FK
Nackdala AIS
Nåjdens FK
Neglinge BK
Newroz FC
Nockebyhovs IF
Nord Afrika FC
Norra Vasastans FF
Norrmalmspojkarnas FF
Norrtulls SK
Norsborgs FF
Norsborgs IF
Nynäshamns IF FF
Nynäshamns IF FK
O'higgins IF
Olympiacos FC
Oranje FK
Panellinios IF
Pappas Pojkar FF
Parsian IF
Perdiwar IF
Polonia Falcons FF
Preben BoIS
Pröpa SK
Pumas-Galapagos IK
Ra Stockholm FS
Rågsveds IF
Rågsveds IF DFF
Rapa-Nui FK
Rara Avis BK
Råsunda FC
Råsunda IS
Real Antartica IF
Real Gonzo FF
Redo Ungdom SK
Reymersholms IK
Rissne IF
Robo United FC
Rönninge Salem Fotboll
Rönninge SK FK
Rosenövarnas FF
Roslags-Kulla IF
Rotebro IS FF
Rotebro Ungdom IS FF
Runby IF
Rydbo IF
S:t Petrus/Paulus IF
Salem FF
Saltsjöbadens IF
Santiago Wanderers IOKF
Sätra FF
Sätra SK
Segeltorps IF
Serhat SK
Sickla IF
Skå DFF
Skå IK
Skarpa BK
Skogås-Trångsunds FF
Skönadals BK
Sköndals IK
Söder United FF
Södersnäckornas BK
Södertörns Brandförsvars IF
Solberga BK
Solberga FF
Sollentuna DFF
Sollentuna Fotboll IF
Sollentuna United FF
Sollentuna United FK
Sörskogens IF
Sorunda IF
Spånga DFF
Spånga IF
Spånga IS FK
Spåret FC
Spårvägens FF
Srbija FF
SS Stockholm Södra
Stockholm BK
Stockholm Futsal Club
Stockholm IK
Stockholm Snipers IF
Stockholms All Stars IK
Stockholms IF Kurdiska
Stockholms Internationella IK
Stockholms MF
Stockholms-Postens IK
Stocksunds IF
Stora Vika IF
Storkyrkopojkarna
Storskogens SK
Stureby SK
Stuvsta FF
Stuvsta IF
Sundbybergs IK
Sur a Norte IF
SuS IF
Svensk-Syrianska IF i Sundbyberg
Täby FF
Täby IS FK
Tallkrogens IF
Tensta IF
Tensta United FF
The Disciples IK
Tolvan IK
Tolvans FK
Topkapi IF
Tornparkens FK
Torstens Lärjungar BK
Trångsunds FF
Trånkan Team IF
Tudor Arms FC
Tullinge BK
Tullinge FF
Tullinge Triangel Pojkar FK
Tungelsta IF
Turebergs IF
Turkiska SK
Tynnered FF
Tyresö DFF
Tyresö FF
Ulriksdals SK
Ursvik IK
Vallentuna BK
Vallentuna BK DF
Vallentuna DFF
Vällingby AIK
Vårberg-Skärholmen SK
Värmdö DFF
Värmdö IF
Värtans IK
Vasa Ungdom IF
Vasalunds DFF
Vasalunds IF
Vasasällskapet FK
Vasastans BK
Väsby Futsalklubb
Väsby IK FK
Väsby Mundial FK
Väsby United AB
Vaskaalla IF
Västerhaninge IF
Västerorts FK
Västerorts IF
Västertorps BK
Vendelsö FF
Vendelsö IK
Viggbyholms IK
Viking Södermalm BK
Viksjö IK
Visättra FF
Visättra United FC
Wårby United FF
Westermalms IF FK
Wollmars FF
X-Cons IF
Zinkens FC
Åkersberga BK
Åkersberga BK DFF
Åkeshovs IF Fotboll
Årsta Allmänna IK
Årsta FF
Älta DFF
Älta Futsal Club
Älta IF
Älvsjö AIK FF
Älvsjö United IK
Ängby IF
Örby IS
Örnarna IF
Örnens FF
Ösmo GIF FK
Östermalms BK
Österskärs TFF

League Competitions 
Stockholms FF run the following League Competitions:

Men's Football
Division 4  -  three sections
Division 5  -  three sections
Division 6  -  six sections
Division 7  -  twelve sections

Women's Football
Division 3  -  two sections
Division 4  -  two sections
Division 5  -  three sections

Footnotes

External links 
 Stockholms FF Official Website 

Stockholms
Organizations based in Stockholm
Sports organizations established in 1917
1917 establishments in Sweden
Football in Stockholm